Race Rocks Ecological Reserve is a BC Parks ecological reserve off the southern tip of Vancouver Island in the Strait of Juan de Fuca in Metchosin, British Columbia, Canada.

Description
That area is leased by the Canadian Coast Guard.

Because of the location in a high tidal current area, there is an exceptional variety of marine life to be found, including marine mammals, sea birds, fish, marine invertebrates, and marine algae and sea grass. It is a haulout area for California and Northern sealions and a birthing rookery for Harbour seals and it is also the most northerly birthing colony on the Pacific Coast of North America for the elephant seal, Mirounga angustirostris.

History
The idea of protecting Race Rocks came about following a marine science project by the students of Pearson College UWC under the supervision and guidance of their teachers, Garry Fletcher and Marks McAvity, in 1978. They described an area of great biodiversity and ecological importance. In 1980, the rocks and surrounding areas were protected as an ecological reserve under joint BC Parks-Pearson College UWC management.

In 1998, Race Rocks was proposed to become the first marine protected area of Canada. However, Fisheries and Oceans Canada deemed the site unfit for the new designation and the bid was cancelled in 2000. Instead, the Endeavour Hydrothermal Vents would go on to become the first marine protected area in 2003.

In 2006 and 2007, the Race Rocks Tidal Power Demonstration Project was installed. After a six-year period for experimental research, the tidal energy generator was removed.

See also
Trial Islands Ecological Reserve

References

External links
  Home page of racerocks.com and racerocks.ca website
  Pearson College UWC
Images of Race Rocks on Google Earth
Race Rocks on the Friends of Ecological Reserves website

Protected areas of British Columbia
Strait of Juan de Fuca